The Get of Cleves was a contentious international 18th-century divorce case that ended when the allegedly insane husband remarried his "wife" in a marriage ceremony that omitted the major portions of a standard Jewish wedding. The date on the get (divorce document) was 22 Elul 5526, and it was written in
a German-Dutch border town, Cleves, fourteen days after the date on the 8 Elul 5526 (August 14, 1766) marriage document. The truncated ceremony was in 1767.

The central issue was whether the husband was of sound mind at the time of the divorce. Two books, published 1769 (Ohr HaYashar) and 1770 (Ohr Yisroel) gave extensive details of the case. A three part article about this case was published 2015.

Case summary
A newly married man's odd behavior led to a secretive on-the-run divorce. The document was written in a bordertown between Dutch and German territories named Cleves, and an asset split favoring the wife, when it was revealed to the husband's family, led to a challenge. Since the husband was alleged to not be mentally competent, this would mean that they were still married, unless the marriage was annulled. Various reputable rabbis in different countries disagreed on important legal details. The husband had left Poland and gone to London, while a major court in Germany, upon the request of a rabbi in Poland, had issued a controversial ruling nullifying the divorce.

Further complications were that the Polish rabbi had written two identical letters, and the ruling in the second court was that the divorce was valid. Since the Polish rabbi died unexpectedly before either ruling came through, rabbis in many countries took sides.

Conclusion
Some time after talking with one rabbi in London, and subsequently with another, the husband returned to Poland, then traveled with his "wife" to Frankfort, Germany, whose court accounted for the minority opinion that the divorce was invalid. As described in a book written a century later, the husband used a new ring and declared "At od mekudeshet li betaba’at zo kedat Moshe ve-Yisrael (You remain betrothed to me with this ring in accordance with the laws of Moses and Israel).

Aftereffects
Insanity pleas in the 20th and 21st centuries regarding marriage and divorce now have a better foundation, and it is still being discussed both in religious courts and academia.

References

External links
 a talk: Insanity and the Crazy Story of the Get of Cleves

Jewish marital law
Divorce in Judaism
Judaism in Germany

he:הגט מקליווא